Erato was one of the Greek Muses.

Erato may also refer to:

 Erato (mythology), name of several mythological figures
 Erato (gastropod), a genus of gastropods
 Erato (plant), a genus of plants
 Erato (band), Swedish indie pop band
 Erato (duo), Bosnian R&B duo
 Erato Records, a record label
 Erato of Armenia, an ancient queen of Armenia
 62 Erato, an asteroid